Victor is a solo album by Rush guitarist Alex Lifeson under the pseudonym "Victor", released in January 1996 on Anthem Records. The album was recorded at Lerxst Sound (Lifeson's home studio) from October 1994 through July 1995.

The album reached number 99 on the Billboard 200 in 1996 and received a 1997 Juno Award nomination for Best New Group.

Track listing
 "Don't Care" (Alex Lifeson) – 4:04
 "Promise" (Lifeson, Bill Bell) – 5:44
 "Start Today" (Lifeson) – 3:48
 "Mr. X" (Instrumental) (Lifeson) – 2:21
 "At the End" (Lifeson, Adrian Zivojinovich) – 6:07
 "Sending Out a Warning" (Lifeson, Bell) – 4:11
 "Shut Up Shuttin’ Up" (Lifeson, Bell, Charlene, Esther) – 4:02
 "Strip and Go Naked" (Instrumental) (Lifeson, Bell) – 3:57
 "The Big Dance" (Lifeson, Zivojinovich) – 4:14
 "Victor" (Lifeson, W. H. Auden) – 6:25
 "I Am the Spirit" (Lifeson, Bell)– 5:31

"Victor" is based on the poem by W. H. Auden.

Personnel
 Alex Lifeson – spoken vocals (5, 7, 10), guitars, keyboards, bass, mandola, programming, production
 Les Claypool – bass (9)
 Peter Cardinali – bass
 Bill Bell – guitar
 Dalbello – lead vocals (3)
 Edwin – lead vocals (1, 2, 6, 9, 11)
 Blake Manning – drums
 Colleen Allen – horn

Lifeson's wife Charlene is one of the two women in the track 7 dialogue; the other woman is simply listed as "Esther".

Singles

References

External links

Alex Lifeson albums
1996 debut albums
Anthem Records albums